

Events
 Guittone d'Arezzo is exiled from Arezzo due to his Guelphs and Ghibellines sympathies

Births
 Shekh Bhano (died 1326), Bangladesh who wrote the poetical work Ashararul Eshk

Deaths
 Najmeddin Razi (born 1177), Persian Sufi

References 

13th-century poetry
Poetry